Tumshukayko is a pre-Inca archeological site near Caraz, Huaylas Province, Ancash Region, Peru.

It is recently discovered and still under research.
Its main structures are found on the right bank of Llullan river, West flank of the Cordillera Blanca, 1 km north from the city of Caraz, at an elevation of 2300m above sea level. Recent investigations propose the site belongs to the Late Pre Ceramic (around 2000 BCE), even when upper sediments shows evidences of a later occupations (Mid Early Huaylas Culture), around 300 BCE - 300 CE.

The fine stone works forms a circular structure, consisting on platforms, terraces and stairways. The most outstanding product from this culture are the stone head (cabezas clavas) and triangular stones, which clearly tells about an early Chavin civilization. [1]

The earliest structures were built, accordingly with chronology, between La Galgada (3,000 - 2,000 b.C) and Chavin (1,200 - 300 BC). The artistic production recalls a lot of those found at the Moxeke complex, on Casma Valley.

Around 1873, the Italian explorer Antonio Raimondi described the place as a "hill",  partially destroyed, built with huge stone walls. In 1919, Dr. Julio C. Tello confirms this description by writing that the structure includes platforms and terraces forming inside aisles and stairways. By 1990 some work was performed, removing debris and waste.

Importance
Accordingly, with the general outline of the buildings, it seems to be a huge monumental center.

Etymology
Tumshu = Core, center, Kayko = We are.

So we could say the meaning is:  "We are the Center"

Site description
The Tumshukayko culture was set 1 km north from the present-day city of Caraz, and seemed to be a center for those people living in the surrounding areas. The monument is a massive flat-topped circular structure, surrounded by lower semi-circular walls, separated from each other about 2,40m,  and this empty space was filled with loose rocks and earth. The outside walls are decorated with geometrical sculptures and carvings.

The structure extends approximately 300m in diameter and 25m in elevation.

References
 Boletin Museo de Arqueologia y Antropologia Universidad Mayor de San Marcos, Lima, Peru. , 2005; 6 (1) : 19-26

Archaeological sites in Peru
Archaeological sites in Ancash Region